Thai Dai Van Nguyen (born 12 December 2001) is a Czech chess Grandmaster of Vietnamese descent.

Biography
Nguyen's father is a Vietnamese businessman.

In 2011, Nguyen won the Czech Youth Chess Championship in the U10 age group. After that, he twice in a row won the Czech Youth Chess Championship in the U12 age group (2012, 2013).

In 2016, Nguyen was awarded the FIDE International Master (IM) title and received the FIDE Grandmaster (GM) title two years later. At just 16, Nguyen became the youngest chess grandmaster in the Czech Republic.

In 2017, he participated in the Budapest International Chess Tournaments First Saturday, where he won twice.

He participated in the European Youth Chess Championships and World Youth Chess Championships in the different age groups. Best result - in 2019, in Bratislava, Nguyen won the European Youth Chess Championship in the O18 age group.

He played in Chess World Cup 2021, winning in the first round against Ádám Kozák but getting knocked out in the second round after losing against Andrey Esipenko.

Notes

References

External links

Thai Dai Van Nguyen chess games at 365chess.com

2001 births
Sportspeople from Prague
Czech chess players
Czech people of Vietnamese descent
Chess grandmasters
Living people